Magnus Cedenblad (born April 10, 1982) is a retired Swedish mixed martial artist who competed in the middleweight division of the Ultimate Fighting Championship, among others.

Mixed martial arts career

Early career

Cedenblad has said that he took up mixed martial arts because he wanted to learn to kick like Mirko "Cro Cop" Filipović and punch like Javier Garcia Roche.

He is a former European and Scandinavian Amateur champion in Shootfighting.

He started his MMA career on the European circuit in 2007. After losing his first two as a light heavyweight, he dropped down to middleweight and went 10-1 in his next 11 fights, with 6 wins by KO/TKO and 3 by submission, finishing 7 opponents in the first round.

Ultimate Fighting Championship
On January 5, 2012 it was announced that Cedenblad had signed with the UFC.

Cedenblad made his UFC debut against Francis Carmont on April 14, 2012 at UFC on Fuel TV: Gustafsson vs. Silva. After a good performance in the begin of the fight, winning the first round, he eventually lost via rear naked choke submission in the second round.

Cedenblad was expected to face Rafael Natal at UFC on Fox: Johnson vs. Dodson, but was forced out of the bout with an injury, and was replaced by Sean Spencer.

He was briefly linked to a bout against Robert McDaniel on August 28, 2013 at UFC Fight Night: Condit vs. Kampmann 2, but McDaniel's opponent was later changed to be Brad Tavares.

Instead, Cedenblad faced Jared Hamman on August 31, 2013 at UFC 164. He won the fight by submission due to a guillotine choke 57 seconds into the first round, giving him his first UFC win and serving Hamman the first submission loss of his career.

Cedenbald was expected to face Alessio Sakara on October 26, 2013 at UFC Fight Night 30, replacing an injured Tom Watson. However, Cedenblad himself later had to withdraw from the bout due to an injury, and was replaced by newcomer Nicholas Musoke, one of his main training partners.

Next he faced undefeated Krzysztof Jotko on May 31, 2014 at UFC Fight Night 41. After controlling the first round of action, he won the fight by submission due to a guillotine choke in the very last second of round two, serving Jotko the first loss of his career. He was also awarded his first Performance of the Night bonus for his efforts.

Cedenblad faced touted undefeated promotional newcomer Scott Askham on October 4, 2014 at UFC Fight Night 53. Despite getting caught and dropped by a front kick in round two, Cedenbland controlled the action through the rest of the fight, earning the unanimous decision victory.

Coming back from a one-and-a-half-year layoff due to injuries, Cedenblad faced Garreth McLellan on May 8, 2016 at UFC Fight Night 87. He scored a knockdown from a straight right hand in round 1 and won the fight by TKO early in round 2 after stunning McLellan with a head kick followed by a barrage of uppercuts against the fence.

Cedenblad returned to face Jack Marshman on November 19, 2016 at UFC Fight Night 99. He lost the back and forth fight via TKO in the second round.

Cedenblad was expected to face Chris Camozzi on May 28, 2017 at UFC Fight Night 109. However, Cedenblad was removed from the card on 27 March and replaced by Trevor Smith.

On August 14, 2018, it was announced that Cedenblad announced he retired from the sport due to numerous and continuous injuries.

Personal life
Cedenblad has a degree in Physiotherapy.

Championships and accomplishments

Mixed martial arts
Ultimate Fighting Championship
Performance of the Night (One time) vs. Krzysztof Jotko
Nordic MMA Awards - MMAviking.com
2014 Fighter of the Year

Shootfighting
European Shootfighting League
European Light Heavyweight Shootfighting Champion.
Scandinavian Light Heavyweight Shootfighting Champion.

Mixed martial arts record

|-
| Loss
|align=center| 14–5
|Jack Marshman
| TKO (punches) 
|UFC Fight Night: Mousasi vs. Hall 2
|
|align=center| 2
|align=center| 3:32
|Belfast, Northern Ireland
| 
|-
|Win
|align=center|14–4
|Garreth McLellan
|TKO (head kick and punches)
|UFC Fight Night: Overeem vs. Arlovski
|
|align=center|2
|align=center|0:47
|Rotterdam, Netherlands
|
|-
|Win
|align=center| 13–4
|Scott Askham
|Decision (unanimous)
|UFC Fight Night: Nelson vs. Story
|
|align=center|3
|align=center|5:00
|Stockholm, Sweden
|
|-
| Win
|align=center| 12–4
| Krzysztof Jotko
| Submission (guillotine choke)
| UFC Fight Night: Munoz vs. Mousasi
| 
|align=center| 2
|align=center| 4:59
| Berlin, Germany
| 
|-
| Win
|align=center| 11–4
| Jared Hamman
| Technical Submission (guillotine choke)
| UFC 164
| 
|align=center| 1
|align=center| 0:57
| Milwaukee, Wisconsin, United States
| 
|-
| Loss
|align=center| 10–4
| Francis Carmont
| Submission (rear-naked choke)
| UFC on Fuel TV: Gustafsson vs. Silva
| 
|align=center| 2
|align=center| 1:42
| Stockholm, Sweden
|
|-
| Win
|align=center| 10–3
| Dan Edwards
| Submission (kimura)
| Fight for Chance 1
| 
|align=center| 1
|align=center| 1:26
| Oskarshamn, Sweden
| 
|-
| Win
|align=center| 9–3
| Benas Mikalauskas
| Submission (D'Arce choke)
| Vision Fighting Championship 2
| 
|align=center| 1
|align=center| 1:52
| Karlstad, Sweden
| 
|-
| Win
|align=center| 8–3
| Allan Love
| Decision (unanimous)
|Superior Challenge 6
| 
|align=center| 3
|align=center| 5:00
| Stockholm, Sweden
| 
|-
| Win
|align=center| 7–3
| Valdas Pocevicius
| TKO (punches)
| Vision Fighting Championship 1
| 
|align=center| 1
|align=center| 1:00
| Karlstad, Sweden
| 
|-
| Win
|align=center| 6–3
| Tomas Kuzela
| TKO (punches)
| Heroes Gate 1
| 
|align=center| 2
|align=center| 4:04
| Prague, Czech Republic
| 
|-
| Win
|align=center| 5–3
| Patrick Kincl
| TKO (punches)
| Superior Challenge 5
| 
|align=center| 2
|align=center| 2:32
| Stockholm, Sweden
| 
|-
| Win
|align=center| 4–3
| Jonas Hellqvist
| TKO (punches)
| Superior Challenge 4
| 
|align=center| 1
|align=center| 3:37
| Stockholm, Sweden
| 
|-
| Loss
|align=center| 3–3
| Mats Nilsson
| Submission (rear-naked choke)
| The Zone FC 4 - Dynamite
| 
|align=center| 1
|align=center| 3:49
| Gothenburg, Sweden
| 
|-
| Win
|align=center| 3–2
|Sergei Nikitin
| Submission (rear-naked choke)
| ProFC - Russia vs. Europe
| 
|align=center| 1
|align=center| 4:15
| Rostov-on-Don, Russia
| 
|-
| Win
|align=center| 2–2
| Frank Vatan
| TKO (knees)
| Superior Challenge 2
| 
|align=center| 1
|align=center| 0:51
| Stockholm, Sweden
| 
|-
| Win
|align=center| 1–2
| Danny Doherty
| TKO (punches)
| Superior Challenge 1
| 
|align=center| 1
|align=center| 2:44
| Stockholm, Sweden
| 
|-
| Loss
|align=center| 0–2
| Juha Saarinen 
| Submission (armbar)
| Carelia Fight 3
| 
|align=center| 2
|align=center| 2:02
| Lappeenranta, Finland
|
|-
| Loss
|align=center| 0–1
| Jevgeni Smirnov
| KO (punches)
| The Cage Vol. 7 - Reincarnation
| 
|align=center| 1
|align=center| 0:33
| Helsinki, Finland
|

Amateur mixed martial arts record 

|-
| Win
|align=center| 2–0
| Hannes Åström
| Decision (split)
| Swedish Shootfighting League 07: Shoot Challenge 1
| 
|align=center| 2
|align=center| 5:00
| Stockholm, Sweden
| 
|-
| Win
|align=center| 1–0
| Peter Sernling
| KO (punches)
| Lord of the Ring: Chapter II
| 
|align=center| 1
|align=center| 0:34
| Gävle, Sweden
|

See also
 List of current UFC fighters
 List of male mixed martial artists

References

External links

Official UFC Profile

Swedish male mixed martial artists
Living people
Middleweight mixed martial artists
Mixed martial artists utilizing shootfighting
1982 births
Ultimate Fighting Championship male fighters
Sportspeople from Stockholm